The Ankazomihaboka Formation is a Coniacian geologic formation in the Mahajanga Basin of northwestern Madagascar. The formation comprises claystones and sandstones deposited in a fluvial to lacustrine environment. The formation is overlain by the Marovoay Beds and overlies basalt.

Dinosaur remains diagnostic to the genus level are among the fossils that have been recovered from the formation.

Fossil content 
 "Titanosaurus" madagascariensis
 Majungasaurus crenatissimus (theropod indet.)
 Axelrodichthys sp.
 Ceratodus madagascariensis

See also 
 List of dinosaur-bearing rock formations
 List of stratigraphic units with few dinosaur genera
 List of fossiliferous stratigraphic units in Madagascar
 Geology of Madagascar

References

Bibliography

Further reading 
 Curry, K. A. 1997. Vertebrate fossils from the Upper Cre-taceous Ankazomihaboka Sandstones, Mahajanga Ba-sin, Madagascar. J. Vertebr. Paleontol. 17(suppl.):40A 
 M. D. Gottfried, R. R. Rogers, and K. A. Curry Rogers. 2004. First record of Late Cretaceous coelacanths from Madagascar. Recent Advances in the Origin and Early Radiation of Vertebrates, in G. Arratia, M. V. H. Wilson, and R. Cloutier (eds.), Verlag Dr. Friedrich Pfeil, München 687-691

Geologic formations of Madagascar
Upper Cretaceous Series of Africa
Cretaceous Madagascar
Coniacian Stage
Shale formations
Sandstone formations
Fluvial deposits
Lacustrine deposits
Paleontology in Madagascar
Formations